Group 8 of the UEFA Euro 1968 qualifying tournament was one of the eight groups to decide which teams would qualify for the UEFA Euro 1968 finals tournament. Group 8 consisted of four teams: England, Scotland, Wales, and Northern Ireland, where they played against each other home-and-away in a round-robin format. Group 8's results were formed by combining the results of the 1966–67 and 1967–68 editions of the British Home Championship. The group winners were England, who finished 1 point above Scotland.

Final table

Matches

1966–67 British Home Championship

1967–68 British Home Championship

Goalscorers

References
 
 
 

Group 1
1966–67 in English football
1967–68 in English football
1966–67 in Scottish football
1967–68 in Scottish football
1966–67 in Welsh football
1967–68 in Welsh football
1966–67 in Northern Ireland association football
1967–68 in Northern Ireland association football
England at UEFA Euro 1968
England–Scotland football rivalry